Bilochwala is a town located in the Punjab province of Pakistan. It is located in Faisalabad District at 31°17'0N 73°4'0E with an altitude of 171 metres (567 feet) and lies near to the city of Lahore. Neighbouring settlements include Bismillapur to the west and Miranpur, Punjab to the east.

References

Cities and towns in Faisalabad District